Ostrówek may refer to the following places in Poland:

In Greater Poland Voivodeship (west-central Poland):
Ostrówek, Kalisz County
Ostrówek, Piła County
Ostrówek, Słupca County
Ostrówek, Turek County
Ostrówek, Gmina Sompolno
Ostrówek, Gmina Wierzbinek
Ostrówek, Gmina Wilczyn
Ostrówek, part of the Śródka district of Poznań, formerly a town in its own right

In Kuyavian-Pomeranian Voivodeship (north-central Poland):
Ostrówek, Inowrocław County 
Ostrówek, Sępólno County

In Łódź Voivodeship (central Poland):
Ostrówek, Łęczyca County
Ostrówek, Wieluń County
Ostrówek, Wieruszów County
Ostrówek, Zduńska Wola County

In Lublin Voivodeship (east Poland):
Ostrówek, Hrubieszów County
Ostrówek, Krasnystaw County
Ostrówek, Łęczna County
Ostrówek, Lubartów County

In Masovian Voivodeship (east-central Poland):
Ostrówek, Grójec County
Ostrówek, Otwock County
Ostrówek, Siedlce County
Ostrówek, Sokołów County
Ostrówek, Węgrów County
Ostrówek, Wyszków County
Ostrówek, Gmina Dąbrówka
Ostrówek, Gmina Klembów

In Podlaskie Voivodeship (north-east Poland):
Ostrówek, Bielsk County 
Ostrówek, Gmina Sokółka
Ostrówek, Gmina Suchowola
Ostrówek, Gmina Szudziałowo

In Subcarpathian Voivodeship (south-east Poland):
Ostrówek, Mielec County
Ostrówek, Stalowa Wola County

Others 
Ostrówek, Pomeranian Voivodeship (north Poland)
Ostrówek, West Pomeranian Voivodeship (northwest Poland)